John Swift (June 17, 1761 – July 12, 1814) was an American military officer during the Revolutionary War and the War of 1812.  He founded the town of Palmyra, New York.

Early life 
Swift was born on June 17, 1761, in Kent, in what was then the Connecticut Colony.  His parents were Elisha Swift and the former Mary Ransom; one of his brothers, born two years later, was Philetus Swift, who eventually became a prominent legislator in New York State.

Revolution 
Swift enlisted in the Continental Army and served as a private in Elmore's Regiment (an unnumbered regiment in the Connecticut Line) under Captain Lathrop Allen.

Pennamite Wars 
Swift was among the Connecticuters who attempted to settle in the Wyoming Valley in northeastern Pennsylvania, sparking the Second Pennamite War.  When the Pennsylvania legislature decided the land claims in favor of the Pennsylvania Mennonites, Swift decamped for Western New York (even though the Connecticut settlers were eventually granted Pennsylvania residency).

Palmyra 
In the winter of 1788–89, with the Wyoming Valley situation not going in the Connecticuters' favor, John Swift and John Jenkins purchased a large tract within the Phelps and Gorham Purchase in what is now Wayne County, New York, with the intent of helping their fellow Connecticuters settle there instead.  When Swift set up residence near Ganargua Creek in 1790 (after buying out Jenkins), the area was named "Swift's Landing".  It later was named "Tolland" before being renamed "Palmyra" at the first town meeting in 1796.

Life in Palmyra 
Swift had married Rhoda Sawyer on March 6, 1784; her brother was the one who proposed the name "Palmyra" in 1796.  After Rhoda's death, Swift later married Hepsibah Treat Davidson.  He had four children by his first wife and three more by his second.

War of 1812

Hit-and-run attack in New York
On January 8, 1814, Lt. Colonel Caleb Hopkins and General John Swift who are both militia commanders led a hit-and-run surprise attack on a British contingent that was out collecting wood. Caleb Hopkins and John Swift led 70 American militiamen in this engagement. The American militia surprised the British party. The British suffered 4 killed and 8 captured. The American militia only suffered 1 killed. The Americans withdrew to Canandaigua with their prisoners after their successful surprise attack.

Battle of Pultneyville
On May 14, 1814, a British raiding fleet under Commodore James Lucas Yeo arrived to take away 400 barrels of flour. John Swift who was at this location had 130 militia with him. John knowing that his militia would be easily routed in the open against superior British troops placed his militiamen in the tree line. As the British raiders were gathering the flour. John Swift and his militia opened fire from the tree line. The American militia then divided into two groups. One group of militia positioned themselves below the bank while General Swift's other men were in a nearby ravine. When some British soldiers went beyond the warehouse fence, the Americans opened fire. The British were driven off and withdrew back to sea by their ships with much of the flour. The British suffered 1 killed and 4 wounded. John Swift's men suffered a few slightly wounded.

Failed invasion of Fort George, Ontario
On July 12, 1814, Swift led a charge to take Fort George, near modern-day Niagara-on-the-Lake.  After surprising and capturing a picket post, Swift was wounded by one of the defenders, whose weapons he had not confiscated. Swift quickly leveled his pistol and killed the British soldier who had shot him. These loud shots brought the attention of a British patrol of 60 men. Swift launched an attack against the advice of his men telling him to get medical attention. Swift routed the British patrol, but his wound was severe and he collapsed. His second in command took charge and sent the British patrol fully retreating into Fort George. The American force withdrew back to their camp with John Swift's body as he died. He was buried initially around the region where he died, but a group of Palmyrans repatriated his remains to the cemetery that today bears his name, the General John Swift Memorial Cemetery.

References 

Continental Army officers from Connecticut
American military personnel killed in the War of 1812
United States Army generals
People from New York (state) in the War of 1812
1761 births
1814 deaths
People from Kent, Connecticut
People from Palmyra, New York
Military personnel from Connecticut